Law and Order is a 1953 American Western film directed by Nathan Juran and starring Ronald Reagan, Dorothy Malone and Preston Foster.

Plot
In 1882, sharp-shooting marshal Frame Johnson (Ronald Reagan) apprehends notorious outlaw The Durango Kid and brings him back to Tombstone, Arizona for a fair trial. The whole town, including Frame's two younger brothers, Luther (Alex Nicol) and Jimmy (Russell Johnson), heralds the two men's arrival. Although Frame and the law and order he has brought to Tombstone are widely respected, an angry mob quickly forms around the jail to lynch The Kid. Facing them alone, Frame threatens to shoot anyone who enters the jail, even after Jimmy steps to the head of the crowd. Later, Frame tells Jimmy that he is tired of giving people something they do not appreciate, and that they are leaving town. He then visits his sweetheart Jeannie (Dorothy Malone) at her casino, and after he informs her that he has given up marshaling for a ranch in Cottonwood, she agrees to marry him.

The Johnsons leave town with their friend, coroner Denver Cahoon (Chubby Johnson), planning to send for Jeannie as soon as they are settled. When they arrive at the Cottonwood saloon the next evening, their entrance is noted by local rancher Kurt Durling (Preston Foster), whose hand Frame shot off in a cattle-rustling raid. Durling, who now runs Cottonwood, vows revenge. Minutes later, Frame protects young Johnny Benton from the intimidation of Durling's son Bart. After Bart backs down, Durling slaps his son across the face for his cowardice. The next morning, Durling forces newspaper editor Martin to run a false editorial stating that Frame is a cold-blooded murderer posing as a lawman. Frame ignores it, but is drawn in when a mob gathers in the streets to lynch Johnny, who has killed Bart in self-defense. After Frame ensures that crooked sheriff Fin Elder (Barry Kelley) will take Johnny to jail in the next town, a group headed by Judge Williams asks Frame to take over as sheriff and clean up the town, but Frame refuses.

He and his brothers travel to the ranch but, seeing how much work it needs, return to town. On the way back, they find Johnny's body hanging from a tree. When the Johnsons confront Elder, he lies that he tried to protect Johnny and calls Frame a coward for not trying to take over as marshal. In response, Jimmy punches Elder and Lute volunteers to be marshal. Frame congratulates Lute but leaves for the ranch with Denver and Jimmy. A few days later, Jimmy is on the outskirts of the ranch when he spots a beautiful girl and follows her home. Even after he realizes that she is Durling's daughter Maria, he declares his love for her.

Meanwhile, Durling and his oldest son Frank trick Lute to keep him occupied while they rustle cattle. When Lute finally asks Frame for help, his older brother insists that he would not return to his old life. That night at the saloon, Frank and his henchman Jed shoot Lute. Frame and Jimmy rush to town, arriving just in time to hear Lute apologize for his failure before dying. Furious with both the Durlings and Frame, Jimmy drinks heavily and stalks off to kill Frank, but Denver knocks him out with a bottle to keep him from getting hurt.

The next day, Frame announces that he is the new marshal and makes it illegal to carry a gun in Cottonwood. Although everyone at first refuses, Frame arrests a few men and when people see Judge Williams backing Frame legally, they comply. Back in Tombstone, Jeannie hears that Lute has died and immediately leaves for Cottonwood. There, she informs Frame that she no longer insists that he give up the law. Later that day, Denver, who has locked Jimmy in the jail, agrees to let him out, and Jimmy immediately grabs his gun. He races to Maria, but before they can flee together, Frank comes home, and trapped, Jimmy kills him. He and Maria rush to Frame's to tell him about the incident, and the marshal forcibly locks Jimmy into the jail cell, promising him a fair trial.

Later that night, however, Durling sends Jed to release Jimmy from jail, and, just as he has predicted for the next morning, the townspeople assume that Frame has let his brother escape. Durling gathers a posse to chase Jimmy, but Frame demands to be the one to track his brother down. When Durling pulls out a gun he has hidden in his coat, an unarmed Frame fights back and the two struggle in the street. Suddenly, a stagecoach racing through the town square runs over Durling, after which Frame hops on a horse and takes off after Jimmy. Easily tracing Jimmy's drunken trail, Frame soon finds him in the hills. Jimmy pulls out a gun, but Frame climbs after him, urging him to turn himself in. At the top, Jimmy shoots Frame in the shoulder, but when his brother collapses, he races to Frame's side to rescue him. Judge Williams is trying to dissuade the men from going after Jimmy when both Frame and Jimmy return together. Sure that no jury will convict a man who has returned of his own will, Elder and Jed flee to California. As Maria embraces Jimmy, Frame takes off the marshal badge and promises Jeannie that now he is truly through with the law.

Cast
 Ronald Reagan as Frame Johnson
 Dorothy Malone as Jeannie
 Preston Foster as Kurt Durling
 Alex Nicol as Lute Johnson
 Ruth Hampton as Maria 
 Russell Johnson as Jimmy Johnson
 Barry Kelley as Fin Elder
 Chubby Johnson as Denver Cahoon
 Jack Kelly as Jed
 Dennis Weaver as Frank Durling
 Wally Cassell as Durango Kid
 Richard Garrick as Judge Williams

Production
This was the fourth time W.R. Burnett's story was adapted for a film by Universal, following the 1932, 1937, and 1940 versions.

Susan Cabot was originally meant to play Maria Durling, but backed out of the film due to dental surgery. Ruth Hampton was an entrant in a Miss Universe contest sponsored by Universal and was selected to fill that role; she would later appear in five other Universal-International films.

Russell Johnson remarks that Ronald Reagan was "very political," and that "he couldn't spend a minute without being very political." He and Reagan were on the different ends of the political spectrum but nonetheless, Johnson found Reagan to be an easy man to work with during filming.

This film was shot in Red Rock Canyon, California.

Home media release
Universal first released the film on VHS on January 19, 1999 under the Universal Western Collection label. On May 6, 2003, it was released to DVD under the same label and contained the original theatrical trailer as a bonus feature.

A licensed Blu-ray version was released for the first time on July 16, 2019 by Shout! Factory. This print contains 1080p high-definition video, theatrical trailer, an image gallery, and a poster gallery.

References

 Shooting stars: heroes and heroines of Western film by Archie P. McDonald.
 Best Western Movies: Winning Pictures, Favorite Films and Hollywood "B" Entries by John Howard Reid.

External links
 
 
 
 

1953 films
1950s English-language films
Films based on American novels
Films based on works by W. R. Burnett
Films directed by Nathan Juran
1953 Western (genre) films
American Western (genre) films
Films scored by Henry Mancini
Remakes of American films
Universal Pictures films
1950s American films